Texline Independent School District (TISD) is a school district located in Texline, Texas (USA).

TISD is made up of one school called the Texline School. Its locale is described as "rural" by publicschoolreport.com, and it has a student-teacher ratio of 9.5:1. It provides both primary and secondary education at its single campus, with 13 grades (including one Pre-K). The current (as of 2008) president of the district administration is Jody Bezner, and the superintendent is Gary Laramore Jr.

Texline ISD has earned the state's highest Financial Integrity Rating of Superior Achievement more than once. Its district operating budget was $1,482,000 in 2006.

In 2015, the school and district were rated "Met Standard" by the Texas Education Agency.

History
On October 3, 1891 the County Commissioners appropriated $240 out of the general fund for the purpose of "establishing and maintaining a public school at the town of Texline". Opened in 1892, it became the first school in Dallam County. The school was later moved into the new courthouse upon its completion and held there until 1912 when a two story school building was constructed. By 1922, school enrollment was up to 248 and construction for a new school was begun. It was located where the tennis court now stands. This building was demolished in 1968. Classes began in the fall of 1966 in the present one story building and campus located at 302 E. Pine St.

Student body
During the 2007-2008 school year, the Texline School had 147 students .
 67% were White
 31% were Hispanic
 1% were Native American
 Less than 1% were Asian American
62% of the student body qualified for free or reduced lunch.

Athletics
The Texline Tornadoes compete in the following sports:

Basketball
Cross Country
Golf
Tennis
Track and Field

State Titles
Boys Basketball 
2015(1A), 2021(1A)

References

External links

Texline ISD

School districts in Dallam County, Texas
Schools in Dallam County, Texas
Public K-12 schools in Texas